Cebu Institute of Medicine (CIM) is the independently administered medical school arm of Velez College in Cebu City, Philippines.

Both are located adjacent to each other in F. Ramos Street. Its primary base hospital is the Cebu Velez General Hospital also located in F. Ramos.

History

The Cebu Institute of Medicine is a non-stock, non-profit institution established in June 1957, then known as Cebu Institute of Technology, College of Medicine (CIT – College of Medicine). Its pioneering class of 33 students graduated in 1962 from the then five-year curriculum.

In 1966, CIT – College of Medicine became an affiliate of Velez College serving as its medical school arm under a new name: Cebu Institute of Medicine (CIM). Dr. Jacinto Velez, Sr. became its first dean.

Velez College was founded by Epifania Mendoza Velez with the support of Dr. Jacinto Velez, Sr. who was then the Chairman of the Board of Trustees of its predecessor the Cebu (Velez) General Hospital School of Nursing in school year 1952–1953. Velez College was incorporated on March 28, 1966 and the College of Nursing was opened in 1968–1969 with its first batch of graduates in March 1973. The College of Arts and Sciences (then College of Liberal Arts) was opened in 1966–1967; College of Medical Technology in 1967–1968; and College of Physical Therapy and Occupational Therapy in 1992–1993.

CIM had initial graduates of 33 students in 1962 and since then it has produced 4778 graduates as of 2008. Of these graduates 36 were with honors and 123 were board topnotchers.

In February 1987, CIM was classified by the Board on Medical Education as Level IV, the highest category for medical institutions.

In April 1996, the Commission on Higher Education has identified CIM as one of the three Center of Excellence for Medicine. The Commission on Higher Education has granted CIM an autonomous status in September 2001. The institution is also accredited by PAASCU.

Research and academics
In the 1970s fundamentals of research were introduced to the students of the Cebu Institute of Medicine by the Chairman of the Department of Preventive and Social Medicine, Dr. Florentino Solon with Dr. Tomas Fernandez and Dr. Virginia Mesola.

Some of the important researches were done in coordination with:

Cornell University, Virginia Polytechnic Institute and State University, Pennsylvania State University, University of North Carolina, Washington University School of Medicine, UP Institute of Public Health, UP – PGH Research Institute of Tropical Medicine and University of San Carlos.

Thereafter, research became institutionalized in the Department of Biochemistry, Microbiology, Physiology and Pharmacology and Family & Community Medicine.

The Clinical Epidemiology Unit (CEU) currently composed of Dr. Paterno Veloso Jr., Fidelis E.Quiza, Cheryl K.Bullo and Stephen Bullo; an affiliate of the Southeast Asian Epidemiology Net was established with the primary mission to improve the research capability of the Faculty, Students and Residents in training.

Conducts different Research Methodology Workshops for various specialty societies, hospital residents, and students of medical schools in Visayas and Mindanao.
Provides consultative services to students, residents, consultants and faculty members undertaking research studies.

As one of the five acclaimed Center of Medical Excellence, CIM was tasked to provide a series of lecture-workshops with mentoring on Research Methodology to a core staff of faculty members of the College of Medicine of the West Visayas State University. Just recently, the five-year Twinning Program on Research Capability Development co-sponsored by the Philippine Council for Health Research and Development and the Association of Philippine Medical Colleges was successfully concluded.

It had been tasked by the Philippine Council for Health Research and Development to be a zonal convenor for the formulation of the Health S & T Priorities 1999–2004 and by the Philippine National Health Research System for the formulation of the National Unified Health Research Agenda 2006–2012 for Zone 3 which covers Regions 6,7 and 8.

On the other hand, Velez College currently has 4 colleges namely the College of Nursing, College of Medical Technology, College of Physical Therapy and Occupational Therapy, and the College of Arts & Sciences.

Awards
On February 16, 1987, CIM was classified by the Board on Medical Education as Level IV, the highest category for medical institution.

In April 1996, the Commission on Higher Education has identified CIM as one of the three Center of Excellence for Medicine.It earned the distinction of being the only Center of Excellence for the entire Visayas and Mindanao.

The Commission on Higher Education has granted CIM an autonomous status in September 2001.

The school has likewise received recognition from the Center for Higher Education (CHED) and the Philippine Accreditation of Schools, Colleges and Universities (PAASCU), the first medical school in the Visayas and Mindanao to be granted such accreditation.

Problem-based learning methodology
In academic year 2001–2002, the institution initially implemented the competency-based PBL approach curriculum in the first year class and became fully PBL in all three-year levels by school year 2003–2004.

The first batch of the full PBL students graduated in April 2005 and took the board examinations that same year.

From the first PBL class, during the August 2006 exam, 98% passed with two students topping the board examinations.

Student performance
From its 33 graduates in 1962, CIM has produced about 4,750 graduates as of 2009, 35 of whom graduated with honors.

Some 110 of its graduates have placed in the top ten of the Physician's Licensure Examinations with 8 graduates garnering first place. Its graduates over the past 10 years obtained an average passing percentage of 93.3%,keeping CIM among the first five top medical schools in the country.

In 2006, the passing percentage for the board exam of the first graduates of PBL was 98%. Thereafter, the school boasts of an exemplary track record in the Philippine medical licensure examinations with an impeccable 100% passing percentage in the last six successive board examinations.

Velez College has been a consistent top performer in the Medical Technology, Nursing, Physical Therapy and Occupational Therapy Licensure Examinations in several years.

References

External links
 Cebu Institute of Medicine Official site
 Velez College Official Site

Medical schools in the Philippines
Universities and colleges in Cebu City
Educational institutions established in 1957
1957 establishments in the Philippines